Stephen Elliott Moore (October 1, 1960 – October 25, 1989) was an American football offensive tackle who played five professional seasons with the New England Patriots in the National Football League (NFL). Moore attended Tennessee State University.

Moore was shot and killed in October 1989, following a robbery outside a convenience store in Memphis.

References 

1960 births
1989 deaths
Players of American football from Memphis, Tennessee
American football offensive tackles
Tennessee State Tigers football players
New England Patriots players